"Sober" is a song by American rock band Tool. The song was released as the first single from their debut studio album, Undertow. Tool guitarist Adam Jones has stated in an interview that the song is about a friend of the band whose artistic expression only comes out when he is under the influence. "A lot of people give him shit for that," Jones explains. "If you become addicted and a junkie, well, that's your fault."

Writing
"Sober" is one of the earliest songs composed by Maynard James Keenan, with roots dating back to a 1987 live performance (released as Peace Day with his first band, Children of the Anachronistic Dynasty) in which the song was called "Burn About Out". The song contains some lyrics from the first verse of "Sober", with the same basic melody, although the melody is considerably faster and has an instrumental chorus.

The song was recorded by Keenan with Tool for the first time in mid-1991 on a demo tape titled 72826.

Sober has a similar chord progression to the Led Zeppelin song "Kashmir", which has inspired other bands to do mashups of the two songs, something which Tool has approved of.

Music video

A video for "Sober" was made in 1993. It debuted in May of that same year and was directed by Fred Stuhr. It was filmed using stop-motion animation, with the characters' models designed by Adam Jones. It was the first of Tool's videos to be made in stop motion, the earlier promo video for "Hush" being live action. Whereas all four band members could be seen at all times during the previous clip, "Sober" shows only brief flashes of them.

The video's protagonist is a small, humanoid being, who lives and sleeps in an abandoned mansion, in a rusty room sparsely decorated with a table, a chair, and a bed with no mattress and a curtain as a blanket. He happens to stumble upon a wooden box, which he opens near the beginning. Its contents are kept hidden for the majority of the video's duration, but it seems whatever it is has had adverse mind altering effects – there are repeated shots of the humanoid levitating in his chair, and his head and arm vibrating wildly. While experiencing these effects, the figure ventures through his living quarters and its many corridors.

The climax provides a barrage of imagery and revelations: a figure attached to a wall behind a translucent screen, a sentry of sorts wielding a mobile, robotic cannon and an organic substance flowing through a pipe found in the house. At the end, the box is empty, leaving the viewer to determine its meaning.  

Nirvana frontman Kurt Cobain claimed the video was a “shameless ripoff” of the stop-motion animations by filmmakers the Brothers Quay.

Formats and track listings

Personnel
Tool
Maynard James Keenan – vocals
Adam Jones – guitar
Paul D'Amour – bass
Danny Carey – drums

Release history

Chart performance

References

1993 debut singles
Animated music videos
Songs about drugs
Songs written by Maynard James Keenan
Songs written by Danny Carey
Songs written by Paul D'Amour
Songs written by Adam Jones (musician)
Stop-motion animated music videos
Tool (band) songs
Zoo Entertainment (record label) singles